Brett Martin (born 23 January 1963) is a former professional squash player who was among the game's leading players in the late-1980s and early-1990s. Brett was part of the winning Australian team at the 1989 Men's World Team Squash Championships and 1991 Men's World Team Squash Championships and was also a runner-up in the 1993 Men's World Team Squash Championships. He reached a career-high world ranking of World No. 2 in 1994.

Martin comes from one of squash's most successful families. His brother Rodney Martin and sister Michelle Martin were also top professional players.

References

Australian male squash players
1963 births
Living people
20th-century Australian people
21st-century Australian people